Loxomorpha cambogialis is a moth in the family Crambidae. It was described by Achille Guenée in 1854. It is found in Brazil, Venezuela, Jamaica, Puerto Rico Cuba and Florida.

The wingspan is about 18 mm. Adults are on wing from June to September.

References

Moths described in 1854
Spilomelinae